Bear Transit is the bus service operated by the Department of Parking and Transportation of the University of California, Berkeley. Its fleet includes a combination of shuttle vans and passenger buses (small and regular-sized), with all of its passenger buses formerly owned by AC Transit. In the early 2000s the passenger buses used were refurbished by AC Transit. Bear Transit connects various areas of the university, including student housing, the main campus, the Hill area, Downtown Berkeley (including Berkeley BART), and distant locations such as Lawrence Hall of Science in the East Bay Hills and the Clark Kerr Campus south of the main campus. It also provides shuttle service to the Richmond Field Station (RFS), a research facility also owned by the University, located in Richmond.

Routes and services
Bear Transit operates five daytime and five nighttime routes that operate mostly around the UC Berkeley Campus (with one exception: the RFS line, described later), all of which serve Berkeley BART Station.

On all Cal football home games, game day shuttles carry students and visitors to the California Memorial Stadium two hours before and one hour after games start. Return service after the games, though, is limited.

See also
 Humphrey Go-Bart
 Unitrans

References

External links
 List of Bear Transit routes and descriptions
 Bear Transit System Guide
 Game Day Information

Bus transportation in California
Public transportation in Alameda County, California
University and college bus systems
Transportation in Berkeley, California
University of California, Berkeley